Feminism and racism are highly intertwined concepts in intersectional theory, focusing on the ways in which women of color in the Western World experience both sexism and racism. According to the Western feminist movement, which seeks to end gender oppression, women of color have experienced racism both within and outside of feminist movements, and have also experienced sexism within various anti-racism and civil rights movements. 

In the United States, racism and sexism have affected female activists of Black, Hispanic, Native American, and Asian descent in different ways, highlighting the need for a political movement that is aware of the intersection of race and gender oppression. These experiences of racism and sexism have prevented women of color from fully partaking in such movements, but they have also led to the creation of unique forms of feminism, such as Black feminist theory and multiracial feminism, that actively work against both gender and race oppression. Similarly, transnational feminism seeks to address women's rights outside of the Western world, and looks to address issues like racism, oppressive gender roles, and femicide that impact women globally.

Intersectionality 
A key point in intersectional theory is that in order to understand the unique experiences of Western women of color, it is necessary to consider the combination of both race and gender. Intersectionality posits that identities are combined in a way that prevents any instance of oppression from being pinned on any individual identity one holds. It is argued that the combined societal effect of one's identities are greater than the sum of the individual effects. Because Black women and other women of color are marginalized by both race and gender, they are "two steps removed from [the] white male norm". Therefore, this marginalization is greater than racism and sexism individually. Importantly, women of color are well aware of experiencing multiple forms of marginalization, while white women and men of color may be less aware, depending on their own identities.

Another perspective is that of multiple jeopardy, which states that women of color, specifically Black women, are at risk for multiple forms of oppression, including race, gender, and class. While this framework was originally considered to be a “double jeopardy” in reference to race and gender oppression exclusively, multiple jeopardy highlights the multiplicative, rather than additive, nature of oppression. Multiple jeopardy is nuanced, in the sense that it allows forms of oppression to be more or less salient based on context. For instance, within the feminist movement, race is likely more salient to women of color, since it marks a notable difference between women, and they are more at risk of racial discrimination than gender discrimination.

Racism in the feminist movement 
In regards to the feminist movement, since women of color are marginalized by both their race and gender, they are often excluded from feminist and anti-racist movements. Mainstream feminist theory (in the United States and other developed nations) was conceived from the perspective of white women who often actively ignored the needs of women of color, assumed them to be exempt from white women's concerns, and overgeneralized their platform to speak for “all” women. Women's suffrage movement leaders Susan B. Anthony and Elizabeth Cady Stanton worked with Frederick Douglass and other activists in the American Equal Rights Association (AERA) in 1866 in an effort to win rights for both women and African Americans, but this organization was still viewed as exclusionary to Black women due to its separate treatment of race and gender. The organization dissolved within three years of being founded due to "heated arguments" over the 15th amendment, which gave Black men the right to vote. Many white suffragettes, particularly in the Southern U.S., harbored resentment against Black Americans, specifically men, after the 15th amendment was passed. Despite leading suffragettes initially championing for equal rights alongside Black male activists in AERA, the resentment among white suffragettes led to renewed racism in the women's suffrage movement.

While the entire feminist movement is based on an idea of “sisterhood,” in reality this only applied to white, middle-class women, who did not see a reason to expand their focus outside of their own political needs. Due to this, race was rarely considered to be a pressing topic in the mainstream movement. This exclusionary movement is sometimes referred to as "white feminism"; advocacy of equal rights on behalf of white women and white women only. The definitions of gender oppression and forms of resistance are based on white women's experiences, and definitions of race oppression and forms of resistance are primarily based on Black men's experiences. Therefore, marginalization of women of color cannot be assumed to be covered by both the feminist and anti-racist movements combined. By dismissing the needs and experiences of women of color, the mainstream feminist movement also denies specific forms of resistance that operate within the specific constraints present in the social location of being a woman of color.

Black women 
When feminist theory was still undergoing formation, white theorists actively compared gender oppression to the enslavement of Black individuals in order to mobilize (primarily white) women. At this time, abolitionist movements were already formed and active, and early white feminists used this existing work as a blueprint for their own movement. Specifically, slavery was used as a comparison to highlight the ways in which white men felt entitled to women's work. While this comparison helped to start the feminist movement, it ultimately diminishes the ways in which racial oppression was far worse than sexism at the time, and makes it seem as though white women were exempt from their own perpetration of racism despite their role in perpetuating slavery. However, not all white feminists disregarded race from their own perceptions of feminism, and many became involved with the abolitionist movements of the time. Given that race-based movements required solidarity across gender lines, it was difficult for many white feminists who saw all men as their oppressors to support mixed-gender abolitionist movements, and led to the belief that Black women were not “true” feminists. Similarly, Latina women have been active in various mixed-gender political organizations that focus on issues specific to them, such as immigration and worker's rights. By acting as though Black and Latina women's work in mixed-gender movements was separate from feminism, because they worked with men, white women placed experiences of sexism as more detrimental than experiences of racism, a mindset that has continued throughout time.

During the first wave of demands for suffrage, white women and Black men and women worked together with the goal of securing a universal right to vote. However, when it became clear that the right to vote would only be given along race (i.e., to white women) or gender (Black men) lines, white women began to use racist tactics to argue against giving Black men suffrage. This highlights that while white women have historically based their movement on gaining equality for “all” women, they have continually forgotten Black women, who sit at the intersection of both race and gender oppression. This assumption that white women speak for all women, and therefore experience all forms of gender oppression, ignores the diversity of experiences from those who are less privileged, specifically the ways in which gender oppression occurs among women of color.

For example, white women have campaigned heavily in rejection of the norm to choose to not have children, as seen in movements around birth control and abortion. However, this ignores the ways in which women of color have been denied the right to have children when they desired, which has been controlled by forced sterilizations and welfare policies. Similarly, calls for perpetrators of gendered violence to be held accountable have historically focused on white women's experiences of violence, with less attention paid to women of color's perpetrators, especially when they are white men. By failing to consider the ways in which the goals of the mainstream feminist movement refuse to acknowledge a history of racism, women of color are unlikely to feel wholly accepted by the movement.

Additional avenues through which mainstream feminism has perpetuated racism include class-based movements and ethnocentrism. Class-based movements, such as calls for socialism or communism, are theoretically designed to reach across both race and gender divisions. However, such movements have primarily been run by white, middle-class men and women, who rejected participation from Black women, due to the fact that most unions denied membership to them. For instance, when white women campaigned to take a greater part in the paid labor force, they could only do this through the underpaid labor of women of color who were able to take care of household duties, while white women began their working duties. Furthermore, the Western feminist viewpoint has often argued in support of imperialism of developing nations in order to expand the reach of “modern” feminism. This mindset ignores differences between cultures, and the ways in which feminist movements vary within specific settings. By considering Western feminism to be the universal ideal, the work of women of color, which seeks a form of gender equality that is culturally competent, is erased.

Asian American women 
Asian American women have been politically active since the civil rights and feminist movements in the 1960s, but have often had a limited presence due to small numbers and significant diversity among them. This has made it difficult to have a single collective force representing Asian American women, with the same shared issues. As a result, most feminist groups specific to Asian American women began at the grassroots level, rather than being a subset of the predominantly white feminist movement. This has contributed to the perception that Asian American participation in the feminist movement is small, when in reality there are reasons for limited involvement. Another important factor contributing to rates of participation are the stereotypes surrounding Asian American women, which paint them as submissive and passive. In order to foster well-being, women need to balance both their racial and gender identities in a way that aligns with their cultural values, which many white feminists have failed to acknowledge. Similar to the issues surrounding Black women in the feminist movement, Asian American women face issues specific to their own racial and gender identities, which are often ignored. Since the mainstream feminist movement is heavily based in American/Western culture, Asian American immigrant women may find it difficult to take part, especially if English is not a first language. Therefore, a large majority of Asian American feminists work within smaller, Asian American focused organizations, in which there is a shared element of ethnicity alongside gender.

Native American women 
Similar to Black and Asian American women, Native American women have a unique set of challenges that are often unacknowledged by the mainstream feminist movement. Native American groups’ organizing is primarily focused on issues surrounding land use and colonialism, but the presence of sexism has consistently been an issue for women activists. Native American sovereignty is seen as being central to gender equality, as colonization played a major role in bringing European gender differentials into Native American tribes. In this sense, by primarily fighting for decolonization, women are also fighting against gender oppression at the same time. While gender oppression may not seem to be a primary issue, fighting sexism has always been a focus for Native American women, regardless of whether or not they identify as feminist. However, given the feminist movement (at least in the United States) advocates for reforming the current social system rather than abolishing it, Native American women who are firmly anti-colonial have a difficult time identifying as part of the mainstream movement. Importantly, there is variation, as women who are more assimilated in American, culture or those who are more concerned with gender oppression are more likely to call themselves feminists, and take part in the mainstream movement.

Feminism and the anti-racism movement 
Anti-racism movements, from abolition to modern civil rights, have been politically active for longer than the gender equality movement that would become modern day feminism. During the abolitionist movement, Black women were crucial in fighting for the womanhood that was denied to them as enslaved individuals. Given that such movements arose before feminism, Black women in particular had already participated for much longer in various ways, allowing them to secure more advanced roles than they were allowed in the (white) movements for gender equality. However, the work of Black women leaders in the civil rights movement has consistently been forgotten or ignored, especially compared to men who held traditional beliefs regarding gender roles. During the civil rights movement, vital roles included mobilizing followers and raising money, both of which were often done on a community-level by Black women of various backgrounds. While male leaders often received a majority of media attention, the work of Black women was crucial to the movement, but remained in the background. Of the few Black women who were able to work their way into leadership positions in different organizations, widespread racism made open involvement even more precarious, since Black women were often denied union membership, and were at a higher risk of being fired due to racial and/or gender discrimination. Furthermore, losing a job due to political involvement was riskier for Black women, since employers were less likely to hire them in the first place.

Transnational Feminism 
Transnational Feminism is a feminist theory that was created as a response to western feminism, that seeks to explicate and address women's rights issues such as racism, sexism and class issues on a global scale. In addition, transnational feminism seeks to explore how intersecting identities such as race and nationality, combine to create unique women rights issues that women outside of the western world face.

Potential solutions 
Two main problems regarding coalition building between the feminist and anti-racism movements are differing ideological beliefs and goals, as well as the unequal power relations between groups (which often place women of color at the bottom of the power hierarchy). In addition, Black feminism must work to be palatable to white feminism in order to access shared resources, meaning that experiences that are wholly unique to the Black community are ignored, due to unequal power relations. Despite this, these challenges do not completely prevent coalition work. While shared oppression alone is not enough to ensure solidarity, women of color and other activists have individually continued to put in the work needed to promote a movement that promotes both gender and racial equality. Women of color have come together in response to racism from the mainstream feminist movement, by both emphasizing a shared difference from white women, and acknowledging the differences within their own experiences. Recognizing the ways in which the experiences and histories of white women have been prioritized within the feminist movement is crucial to highlighting the need for continued activism and coalition building.

Women of color have historically been the primary voices advocating for a racial perspective in the feminist movement, and a gendered perspective in the anti-racism movement, as those with privileged identities did not consider reaching out into the margins. Since they understand the need to fight for multiple avenues of equality at the same time, those with multiple marginalized identities are more suited for this coalition work. The shared identity required for a racially-inclusive feminist movement is shaped by recognizing the ways in which gender and race oppression are similar, and shaped by shared dominant groups, even if individual identities of members do not exactly match. In addition, having a global perspective of social issues and shared oppression is useful moving forward, given how intertwined various forms of oppression are. Organizations specific to women of color were not formed as a reaction to the predominantly white second wave feminist movement, but grew alongside it. During second wave feminism, mainstream national organizations, such as the National Organization for Women, would actively resist incorporating the needs of women of color into their agendas. From this, white feminists are seen as the “normal” feminist, while the feminism engaged in by women of color is considered to be a separate form or subset. Pushed aside by popular movements, women of color often resorted to making their own branches, or completely unique organizations, in order to openly work towards both gender and racial equality.

In reaction to the racism prevalent in the mainstream feminist movement and the sexism in anti-racism movements, Black women have proposed their own feminist ideology. This framework aims to make Black women and their experiences visible, create their own goals for the movement, challenge intersecting oppressions (specifically, racism, sexism, and classism), and highlight the strengths of being a Black woman. Black lesbian women were crucial in writing about Black feminist theory, as many activists within this group were critically examining the links between race, class, gender, and sexual oppression. In 1973, the National Black Feminist Organization was formed, but there was never a large movement following the first convention due to limited resources among the Black women who had the time and money to organize, especially compared to the predominantly white National Organization of Women. Womanist has also been proposed as an alternative to Black feminism. This term began being used in the 1980s, and although it is not very widespread, it was designed to allow more freedom of expression for feminists of color, and highlight the unique history of Black women. womanism exists in contrast to (white) feminism, under the assumption that the mainstream feminist movement will continue to uphold white supremacy, and unlike typical feminism, womanism acknowledges the need to support Black men and lesbians in order to achieve equality on multiple fronts. In comparison, Black feminism considers how “traditional” feminist issues (e.g., political rights, reproductive justice) impact Black women specifically, calling out the implicit whiteness of the mainstream feminist movement.

A third proposed solution is multiracial feminism. Multiracial feminism was formed directly by women of color, in response to the need for an analysis of gender dynamics that considers race and the intersection of these identities. This movement acknowledges important identity-based differences that shape unique experiences, while still highlighting the universal experiences of women, and is prominent among Black, Latina, Asian American, and Native American feminists. Key features of multiracial feminism include recognizing the intersection of gender, race, and class; noting the power hierarchies present in such social identities, and the ways in which an individual can be both oppressed and privileged (e.g., white women are oppressed via gender, but privileged via race); and acknowledging the various forms of agency present given different social and resource constraints. In the early 1980s, multiracial feminism began to peak as the general second wave feminist movement began to slow down, and many of the mainstream feminists began to join the anti-racism movement, and acknowledge the relationship between race and gender. With the addition of white women into multiracial feminism, it was necessary for the movement to call for white women to learn and listen about women of color's lived experiences, and to recognize that women of color are not a homogeneous group.

See also 
 Feminism of the 99%
 Femonationalism
 Homonationalism
 Intersectionality
 Multiracial feminist theory
 Misogynoir
 Second wave feminism
 White feminism
 Asian feminist theology

References

Feminism
Racism
Sociological theories
Women's history
Black feminism